HMS Dakins (K550)  was a Captain-class frigate of the Royal Navy during the Second World War. Built as the Buckley-class destroyer escort DE-85 intended for the United States Navy, she was transferred to the Royal Navy in 1943 under the terms of Lend-Lease.

Damaged by a mine in late 1944, she was not repaired before the end of the war. Following the war, she was used as a depot ship until sold for scrapping.

Construction and transfer
The still-unnamed ship was laid down as the U.S. Navy destroyer escort DE-85 by Bethlehem-Hingham Shipyard, Inc., in Hingham, Massachusetts, on 23 June 1943. Allocated to the United Kingdom, she received the British name Dakins and was launched on 18 September 1943. She was transferred to the United Kingdom upon completion on 23 November 1943.

Service history
She was commissioned into service in the Royal Navy as the frigate HMS Dakins (pennant number K550) on 23 November 1943 simultaneously with her transfer from the US. The ship served on patrol and escort duty.

Although heavily damaged, she managed to limp back to Harwich on the east coast of England.

After sufficient repairs to make her seaworthy, Dakins steamed to Antwerp, Belgium, with a skeleton crew and docked at the John Cockerill shipyard in Antwerps Hoboken district for assessment of what further repairs she required. Over the five to six months she was moored at Hoboken, no repairs began due to disruptions to port operations by German V-1 flying bomb and V-2 rocket attacks, and in the end plans to repair her were abandoned. After Victory in Europe Day ( 8 May 1945), she steamed back to Harwich, where she served as a depot ship for smaller ships and craft being laid up there.

Disposal
Dakins was declared a constructive total loss and was sold on 9 January 1947 for scrapping in the Netherlands. The U.S. Navy struck her from its Naval Vessel Register on 7 February 1947.

References

Notes

Bibliography

Destroyer Escort Sailors Association DEs for UK
Captain Class Frigate Association: HMS Dakins K550 (DE 85)

External links
Photo gallery of HMS Dakins (K550)

 

Captain-class frigates
Buckley-class destroyer escorts
World War II frigates of the United Kingdom
Ships built in Hingham, Massachusetts
1943 ships
Maritime incidents in December 1944